Ulysse-Janvier Robillard (1826 – January 1, 1900) was a merchant and political figure in Lower Canada, later Quebec, Canada. He represented Beauharnois in the House of Commons of Canada from 1872 to 1878 as an Independent Conservative.

He was born in Ste-Geneviève, Lower Canada, the son of Joseph Robillard, and was educated there. Robillard was mayor of Beauharnois from 1864 to 1866. He was a produce and grain merchant in Beauharnois. Robillard was married twice: first to Eulalie Paiement and then to Marie-Virginie Lanaud in 1871. He died in Montreal at the age of 74.

References 

1826 births
1900 deaths
Independent Conservative MPs in the Canadian House of Commons
Members of the House of Commons of Canada from Quebec
Mayors of places in Quebec